Jayadeva II was the son of Shivadeva II and a king of the Licchavi dynasty who ruled Nepal in around 700 C.E.

Reign 
He is said to have ruled from 713 C.E. to somewhere around 733 C.E. He kept good relations with Tibet and India.

Personal life 
He was married to Rajyavati, the daughter of king Harshadeva of Gauda.

Subsequent history of Nepal 
The historical records after the period of Jayadeva II are extremely unclear. Nepal, thereafter, enters into a dark period which continued until around 1200 C.E. after which the Malla dynasty started its reign.

References 

History of Nepal
Licchavi kingdom
Nepalese monarchs